Kurgashevo (Qurğaş) is a rural locality (a village) in Leuzinsky Selsoviet, Kiginsky District, Bashkortostan, Russia. The population was 279 as of 2010. There are 4 streets.

Geography 
Kurgashevo is located 14 km southeast of Verkhniye Kigi (the district's administrative centre) by road. Tuguzly is the nearest rural locality.

References 

Rural localities in Kiginsky District